Champaign County is a county located in the U.S. state of Ohio. As of the 2020 census, the population was 38,714. Its county seat and largest city is Urbana. The county takes its name from the French word for "open level country". Champaign County became the 18th of 88 Ohio counties on March 1, 1805. It was carved from Greene and Franklin counties by Legislative action. 

Champaign County comprises the Urbana, OH Micropolitan Statistical Area, which is also included in the Dayton–Springfield–Sidney, OH Combined Statistical Area.

Geography

Adjacent counties
Logan County (north)
Union County (northeast)
Madison County (southeast)
Clark County (south)
Miami County (southwest)
Shelby County (northwest)

Demographics

2000 census
As of the census of 2000, there were 38,890 people, 14,952 households, and 10,870 families living in the county. The population density was 91 people per square mile (35/km2). There were 15,890 housing units at an average density of 37 per square mile (14/km2). The racial makeup of the county was 95.73% White, 2.30% Black or African American, 0.31% Native American, 0.25% Asian, 0.02% Pacific Islander, 0.31% from other races, and 1.08% from two or more races. 0.69% of the population were Hispanic or Latino of any race.

There were 14,952 households, out of which 34.00% had children under the age of 18 living with them, 59.70% were married couples living together, 9.20% had a female householder with no husband present, and 27.30% were non-families. 23.50% of all households were made up of individuals, and 9.40% had someone living alone who was 65 years of age or older. The average household size was 2.56 and the average family size was 3.01.

In the county, the population was spread out, with 26.20% under the age of 18, 7.90% from 18 to 24, 28.70% from 25 to 44, 24.60% from 45 to 64, and 12.60% who were 65 years of age or older. The median age was 37 years. For every 100 females, there were 95.90 males. For every 100 females age 18 and over, there were 92.90 males.

The median income for a household in the county was $43,139, and the median income for a family was $50,430. Males had a median income of $38,265 versus $26,241 for females. The per capita income for the county was $19,542. About 5.10% of families and 7.60% of the population were below the poverty line, including 9.90% of those under age 18 and 7.60% of those age 65 or over.

2010 census
As of the 2010 United States Census, there were 40,097 people, 15,329 households, and 10,925 families living in the county. The racial makeup of the county was 94.7% white, 2.2% black or African American, 0.4% Asian, 0.4% American Indian, 0.4% from other races, and 1.9% from two or more races. Those of Hispanic or Latino origin made up 1.1% of the population. In terms of ancestry, 27.6% were German, 14.9% were Irish, 14.3% were American, and 11.8% were English.

Of the 15,329 households, 33.7% had children under the age of 18 living with them, 55.9% were married couples living together, 10.2% had a female householder with no husband present, 28.7% were non-families, and 23.9% of all households were made up of individuals. The average household size was 2.56 and the average family size was 3.02. The median age was 39.7 years.

The median income for a household in the county was $49,246 and the median income for a family was $58,433. Males had a median income of $44,920 versus $32,847 for females. The per capita income for the county was $23,438. About 10.0% of families and 12.9% of the population were below the poverty line, including 18.4% of those under age 18 and 6.3% of those age 65 or over.

Politics
Champaign County is a Republican stronghold county in presidential elections, it has only voted Democratic three times since 1856.

|}

Communities

City
Urbana (county seat)

Villages
Christiansburg
Mechanicsburg
Mutual
North Lewisburg
St. Paris
Woodstock

Townships

Adams
Concord
Goshen
Harrison
Jackson
Johnson
Mad River
Rush
Salem
Union
Urbana
Wayne

https://web.archive.org/web/20160715023447/http://www.ohiotownships.org/township-websites

Census-designated place
Rosewood

Unincorporated communities

 Bowlusville
 Cable
 Carysville
 Catawba Station
 Crayon
 Darnell
 Eris
 Five Points
 Fountain Park
 Grandview Heights
 Kennard
 Kingscreek
 Lippincott
 Middletown
 Millerstown
 Mingo
 Northville
 Powhattan
 Springhills
 Terre Haute
 Thackery
 Westville

Libraries
The following libraries serve the communities of Champaign County.
 Champaign County Library in Urbana, Ohio and North Lewisburg, Ohio
 Mechanicsburg Public Library in Mechanicsburg, Ohio
 St. Paris Public Library in St. Paris, Ohio and Christiansburg, Ohio

Notable people 
Lawrence Borst, veterinarian and Indiana state legislator
John Isaiah Caldwell, lawyer
Jim Jordan, U.S. Representative for Ohio's 4th congressional district
Michael Kent, comedian and magician
David Taylor, Olympic gold medalist wrestler

See also
Kiser Lake State Park, located in Johnson Township
National Register of Historic Places listings in Champaign County, Ohio

References

External links
Champaign County Government's website
Champaign County's Community Portal website
ChampaignOnline

 
1805 establishments in Ohio
Populated places established in 1805